Raphaël Glucksmann (born 15 October 1979) is a French journalist, film director, and political figure. In May 2019, he was elected a member of the European Parliament, within the S&D alliance.

Early life and career
Glucksmann is the son of philosopher André Glucksmann. Between 2005 and 2012, he was an adviser to former then-President of Georgia Mikheil Saakashvili.

Political career

Beginnings
In 2018, Glucksmann founded the French centre-left French political party Place Publique.

Member of the European Parliament, 2019–present
On 26 May 2019, Place publique and the French Socialist Party presented a joint list at the European Parliament election, with Glucksmann as the head, under the title "Envie d'Europe, écologique et sociale". The list obtained a total of 6.2%, thereby securing the election of six Members to the European Parliament: Glucksmann, Sylvie Guillaume, Eric Andrieu, Aurore Lalucq, Pierre Larrouturou, Nora Mebarek.

In Parliament, Glucksmann has since been serving on the Committee on Foreign Affairs and its Subcommittee on Human Rights. Since 2020, he has been also chairing the Special Committee on Foreign Interference in all Democratic Processes in the European Union.

In addition to his committee assignments, Glucksmann is a member of the Responsible Business Conduct Working Group and the Spinelli Group.

In his parliamentary work, Glucksmann has focused attention on the Xinjiang re-education camps, for which he has been sanctioned by the Ministry of Foreign Affairs of the People's Republic of China.

Political positions
In May 2021, Glucksmann joined a group of 39 mostly Green Party lawmakers from the European Parliament who in a letter urged the leaders of Germany, France and Italy not to support Arctic LNG 2, a $21 billion Russian Arctic liquefied natural gas (LNG) project, due to climate change concerns.

In November 2021, Glucksmann led a group of seven Members of the European Parliament to Taiwan to send a strong signal in support of the self-ruling island, despite a threat of retaliation from China.

Personal life
Glucksmann was married to Georgian and Ukrainian politician Eka Zguladze until 2014.

He has a son, Gabriel, born 12 March 2017, with journalist Léa Salamé.

Publications 
 Je vous parle de liberté, with Mikheil Saakashvili, Paris, Hachette Livre, 2008, .
 Mai 68 expliqué à Nicolas Sarkozy, with André Glucksmann, 2008, .
 Génération gueule de bois, Manuel de lutte contre les réacs, Allary Éditions, 2015, .
 Notre France. Dire et aimer ce que nous sommes, Allary Éditions, 2016.
 Les Enfants du vide. De l'impasse individualiste au réveil citoyen, Allary Éditions, 2018, .
 Lettre à la génération qui va tout changer, Allary Éditions, 2021, .

References

1979 births
Living people
21st-century French essayists
Film directors from Paris
French male journalists
French people of Czech-Jewish descent
French people of Romanian-Jewish descent
Sciences Po alumni
MEPs for France 2019–2024
Place Publique MEPs
People from Boulogne-Billancourt